Minois is a genus of butterflies of the family Nymphalidae.

Species
 Minois aurata (Oberthür, 1909)
 Minois dryas (Scopoli, 1763)
 Minois nagasawae (Matsumura, 1906)
 Minois paupera (Alphéraky, 1888)

References

Satyrini